The arctic Katahdin butterfly (Oeneis polixenes katahdin) is a subspecies of the polixenes arctic (Oeneis polixenes). This particular butterfly is considered endangered because it only appears on Mount Katahdin in the State of Maine, and its small population fluctuates every year.

Description 
The arctic Katahdin butterfly is a yellowish-brown color with semi translucent wings. An adult can measure about 2-4 inches.

Habitat 
The arctic Katahdin butterfly, like other arctic butterflies, prefers tundra conditions However, this particular type of butterfly resides in only one area of the world, the summit of Mount Katahdin in Maine’s Baxter State Park.

Life span 
These butterflies usually have a 2 year life cycle.

Threats 
The arctic Katahdin butterfly is listed in Maine as an endangered species. The main threat to these butterflies are humans. It is currently illegal to collect the arctic Katahdin butterfly.

References 

Oeneis
Butterflies of North America
Butterflies described in 1901
Endangered fauna of the United States
Biota of Maine
North Maine Woods
Butterfly subspecies